Tegula pfeifferi is a species of sea snail, a marine gastropod mollusk in the family Tegulidae. Tegula pfeifferi is more commonly known as "Pfeiffer's Top Shell".

Description
The height of the shell is 30 mm, its diameter 33 mm. The solid, umbilicate shell has a conical shape with an acutely angled periphery. It is dark purplish or brownish-purple and obliquely striate; the base radiately striate or streaked with white. The elevated spire is strictly conical. The apex is eroded. The about 7 whorls are planulate above, the last acutely angular at the periphery. The whorls are smooth or with fine spiral striae, and ill-defined longitudinal folds. The base of the shell is smooth and obsoletely plano-concave. The subhorizontal aperture occupies about half the area of the base. The columella is dentate in the middle, expanded above in a white callus. The circular umbilicus is profound and surrounded by a white zone.

See also 
Littorina littorea

References

External links
 To World Register of Marine Species

 

pfeifferi
Gastropods described in 1846
Marine gastropods